Sar Hur (also Romanized as Sar Hūr; also known as Sirhur) is a village in Gowharan Rural District, Gowharan District, Bashagard County, Hormozgan Province, Iran. At the 2006 census, its population was 219, in 47 families.

References 

Populated places in Bashagard County